Ezekiel Vohn Lindenmuth (born 14 July 1997 in New Zealand) is a New Zealand rugby union player who plays for the  in Super Rugby. His playing position is prop. He has signed for the Chiefs squad in 2021 as a Injury Replacement. He also plays for the Super Rugby franchise, Moana Pasifika.

Reference list

External links
itsrugby.co.uk profile

1997 births
New Zealand rugby union players
Living people
Rugby union props
Auckland rugby union players
Counties Manukau rugby union players
Blues (Super Rugby) players
Chiefs (rugby union) players
Moana Pasifika players
Samoan rugby union players
Samoa international rugby union players